
Nanxi or Nan-hsi may refer to:

Nanxi (theatre) (南戲), an early form of Chinese opera

Places
Nanxi District, Yibin (南溪区), a district of Yibin, Sichuan, China
Nanxi Subdistrict, in Nanxi District, Yibin
Nanxi Township (南溪乡), a township in Taihe County, Jiangxi, China

Towns in China
Nanxi, Anhui (南溪), in Jinzhai County, Anhui
Nanxi, Chongqing (南溪), in Yunyang County, Chongqing
Nanxi, Guangdong (南溪), in Puning, Guangdong
Nanxi, Henan (南席), in Changge, Henan
Nanxi, Yunnan (南溪), in Hekou Yao Autonomous County, Yunnan

Rivers of China
Nanxi River (Yunnan) (南溪河), tributary of the Red River in Yunnan
Nanxi River (Zhejiang) (楠溪江), major tributary of the Ou River in Zhejiang

See also
Nansi District, Tainan, sometimes spelled Nanxi, a district of Tainan, Taiwan
Nan Qi (artist) (南溪) (born 1960), also known as Nan Xi, Chinese artist